Stary Kurlak is a rural locality (a selo) in Novokurlakskoye Rural Settlement, Anninsky District, Voronezh Oblast, Russia. The population was 361 as of 2010. There are 7 streets.

Geography 
Stary Kurlak is located 22 km southeast of Anna (the district's administrative centre) by road. Novy Kurlak is the nearest rural locality.

References 

Rural localities in Anninsky District